This is a list of all past winners of the official GAA GPA All Stars Awards in Gaelic football since the first awards in 1971. As an insight to the prominent players of the 1960s, it also includes the unofficial "Cuchulainn" awards presented from 1963 to 1967 under the auspices of Gaelic Weekly magazine.

For each year since 1995, when the official award began, the All Stars Footballer of the Year is highlighted with FOTY. If the footballer of the year did not win an All Star Award, his name is added to the list as FOTY. The unofficial Texaco Footballer of the Year, awarded since 1958, is a guide to the leading players of the past.

Overview
By the end of 2013, 387 different footballers had received awards. For those with the highest numbers of awards, see GAA GPA All Stars Awards.

As of 2022, the players are from the following teams:
Given as  Team, team's overall total/number of different players to have won while representing this team:
 Kerry, 155/64 (list)
 Dublin, 141/66 (list)
 Cork, 64/42 (list)
 Tyrone, 57/33 (list)
 Meath, 48/26 (list)
 Galway, 43/29 (list)
 Donegal, 34/22 (list)
 Offaly, 30/19 (list)
 Derry, 29/19 (list)
 Mayo, 28? (list)
 Armagh, 24/8 (list)
 Down, 23/18 (list)
 Kildare, 15/12 (list)
 Roscommon, 15/11 (list)
 Monaghan, 13/9 (list)
 Cavan, 5/5
 Laois, 5/5
 Westmeath, 5/4
 Sligo, 4/4
 Fermanagh, 4/3
 Tipperary, 4/3
 Leitrim, 2/2
 Louth, 2?
 Antrim, 1
 Clare, 1
 Wexford, 1
 Wicklow, 1

No player has received an All Star while representing Carlow, Kilkenny**, Limerick, Longford, Waterford, or the overseas county teams of London and New York in football.

Cú Chulainn Awards

1963

1964

1965

1966

1967

1970s

1971

County breakdown
 Galway = 4
 Offaly = 4
 Mayo = 1
 Kerry = 1
 Meath = 1
 Cork = 1
 Sligo = 1
 Antrim = 1
 Down = 1

1972

 Player has previously been selected.

County breakdown
 Offaly = 7
 Kerry = 2
 Donegal = 1
 Galway = 1
 Cork = 1
 Roscommon = 1
 Down = 1
 Armagh = 1

1973

 Player has previously been selected.

County breakdown
 Cork = 7
 Offaly = 3
 Galway = 3
 Kerry = 1
 Derry = 1

1974

 Player has previously been selected.

County breakdown
 Dublin = 6
 Galway = 3
 Cork = 2
 Donegal = 1
 Sligo = 1
 Roscommon = 1
 Kerry = 1

1975

 Player has previously been selected.

County breakdown
 Kerry = 5
 Dublin = 3
 Derry = 3
 Meath = 2
 Cork = 1
 Down = 1

1976

 Player has previously been selected.

County breakdown
 Dublin = 7
 Kerry = 5
 Cork = 2
 Galway = 1

1977

 Player has previously been selected.

County breakdown
 Dublin = 9
 Armagh = 3
 Kerry = 2
 Roscommon = 1

1978

 Player has previously been selected.

County breakdown
 Kerry = 6
 Dublin = 3
 Kildare = 1
 Roscommon = 1
 Cavan = 1
 Down = 1
 Offaly = 1
 Cork = 1

1979

 Player has previously been selected.

County breakdown
 Kerry = 6
 Dublin = 3
 Roscommon = 3
 Monaghan = 1
 Offaly = 1
 Mayo = 1

1980s

1980

 Player has previously been selected.

County breakdown
 Kerry = 7
 Roscommon = 3
 Cork = 2
 Tyrone = 1
 Armagh = 1
 Offaly = 1

1981

 Player has previously been selected.

County breakdown
 Kerry = 9
 Offaly = 3
 Galway = 2
 Down = 1

1982

 Player has previously been selected.

County breakdown
 Offaly = 7
 Kerry = 5
 Cork = 1
 Fermanagh = 1
 Armagh = 1

1983

 Player has previously been selected.

County breakdown
 Dublin = 4
 Kerry = 2
 Offaly = 2
 Cork = 2
 Down = 2
 Galway = 1
 Donegal = 1
 Meath = 1

1984

 Player has previously been selected.

County breakdown
 Kerry = 7
 Dublin = 3
 Tyrone = 2
 Meath = 1
 Galway = 1
 Derry = 1

1985

 Player has previously been selected.

County breakdown
 Kerry = 5
 Dublin = 4
 Mayo = 3
 Monaghan = 1
 Roscommon = 1

1986

 Player has previously been selected.

County breakdown
 Kerry = 6
 Tyrone = 4
 Laois = 2
 Roscommon = 1
 Meath = 1
 Monaghan = 1

1987

 Player has previously been selected.

County breakdown
 Meath = 5
 Cork = 4
 Derry = 2
 Kerry = 2
 Dublin = 1
 Galway = 1

1988

 Player has previously been selected.

County breakdown
 Meath = 5
 Cork = 4
 Dublin = 3
 Monaghan = 2
 Kerry = 1

1989

 Player has previously been selected.

County breakdown
 Cork = 6
 Mayo = 5
 Dublin = 1
 Kerry = 1
 Tyrone = 1
 Roscommon = 1

1990s

1990

 Player has previously been selected.

County breakdown
 Cork = 6
 Meath = 4
 Leitrim = 1
 Galway = 1
 Donegal = 1
 Wicklow = 1
 Down = 1

1991

 Player has previously been selected.

County breakdown
 Meath = 6
 Down = 4
 Dublin = 3
 Roscommon = 1
 Kildare = 1

1992

 Player has previously been selected.

County breakdown
 Donegal = 7
 Derry = 3
 Dublin = 3
 Clare = 1
 Mayo = 1

1993

 Player has previously been selected.

County breakdown
 Derry = 7
 Dublin = 3
 Cork = 2
 Donegal = 1
 Mayo = 1
 Armagh = 1

1994

 Player has previously been selected.

County breakdown
 Down = 7
 Dublin = 3
 Meath = 2
 Leitrim = 1
 Cork = 1
 Tyrone = 1

1995

 Player has previously been selected.

County breakdown
 Dublin = 7
 Derry = 2
 Cork = 2
 Tyrone = 2
 Galway = 1
 Meath = 1

1996

 Player has previously been selected.

County breakdown
 Meath = 5
 Mayo = 5
 Tyrone = 2
 Dublin = 1
 Derry = 1
 Kerry = 1

1997

 Player has previously been selected.

County breakdown
 Kerry = 5
 Kildare = 3
 Mayo = 2
 Meath = 2
 Offaly = 1
 Cavan = 1
 Derry = 1

List of nominees

1998

 Player has previously been selected.

County breakdown
 Galway = 7
 Kildare = 5
 Derry = 1
 Meath = 1
 Tipperary = 1

List of nominees

1999

 Player has previously been selected.

County breakdown
 Meath = 7
 Cork = 4
 Armagh = 2
 Dublin = 1
 Mayo = 1

List of nominees

2000s

2000

 Player has previously been selected.

County breakdown
 Kerry = 6
 Galway = 4
 Derry = 2
 Armagh = 2
 Kildare = 1

List of nominees

2001

 Player has previously been selected.

County breakdown
 Galway = 6
 Meath = 4
 Dublin = 1
 Roscommon = 1
 Westmeath = 1
 Tyrone = 1
 Kerry = 1

List of nominees

2002

 Player has previously been selected.

County breakdown
 Armagh = 6
 Dublin = 3
 Kerry = 2
 Cork = 1
 Donegal = 1
 Sligo = 1
 Tyrone = 1

List of nominees

2003

 Player has previously been selected.

County breakdown
 Tyrone = 7
 Laois = 3
 Armagh = 2
 Galway = 1
 Tipperary = 1
 Donegal = 1

List of nominees

2004

 Player has previously been selected.

County breakdown
 Kerry = 6
 Fermanagh = 2
 Mayo = 2 
 Westmeath = 2
 Tyrone = 1
 Derry = 1
 Wexford = 1

List of nominees

2005

 Player has previously been selected.

County breakdown
 Tyrone = 8
 Kerry = 4
 Armagh = 3

List of nominees

2006

 Player has previously been selected.

County breakdown
 Kerry = 6
 Dublin = 2
 Cork = 2
 Mayo = 2
 Fermanagh = 1
 Donegal = 1
 Armagh = 1

List of nominees

2007

 Player has previously been selected.

County breakdown
 Kerry = 6
 Dublin = 4
 Derry = 2
 Cork = 1
 Meath = 1
 Monaghan = 1

List of nominees

2008

 Player has previously been selected.

County breakdown

 Tyrone = 7
 Kerry = 4
 Westmeath = 2
 Dublin = 1
 Armagh = 1

List of nominees

2009

 Player has previously been selected.

County breakdown
 Kerry = 7
 Cork = 5
 Donegal = 1
 Kildare = 1
 Tyrone = 1

List of nominees

2010s

2010

 Player has previously been selected.

County breakdown
 Cork = 4
 Down = 4
 Kildare = 2
 Sligo = 1
 Louth = 1 
 Tyrone = 1
 Kerry = 1
 Dublin = 1

List of nominations

2011

 Player has previously been selected.

County breakdown
 Dublin = 6
 Kerry = 4
 Donegal = 3
 Mayo = 1
 Kildare = 1

List of nominees

2012

 Player has previously been selected.

County breakdown
 Donegal = 8
 Mayo = 4
 Cork = 2
 Dublin = 1

List of nominees

2013

 Player has previously been selected.

County breakdown
 Dublin = 6
 Mayo = 4
 Monaghan = 2
 Kerry = 2
 Tyrone = 1

List of nominees

2014
	

 Player has previously been selected.

County breakdown
 Kerry= 5
 Donegal= 4
 Dublin= 3
 Mayo= 3

List of nominees

2015
	

 Player has previously been selected.

County breakdown
 Dublin= 7
 Kerry= 4
 Mayo= 2
 Tyrone= 1
 Monaghan= 1

List of nominees

2016
	

 Player has previously been selected.

County breakdown
 Dublin = 6
 Mayo = 4
 Tyrone = 2
 Donegal = 1
 Kerry = 1
 Tipperary = 1

List of nominees

2017

 Player has previously been selected.

County breakdown
 Dublin = 7
 Mayo = 6
 Kerry = 1
 Tyrone = 1

List of nominees

2018

 Player has previously been selected.

County breakdown
 Dublin = 7
 Monaghan = 3
 Tyrone = 2
 Kerry = 1
 Donegal = 1
 Galway = 1

List of nominees

2019

 Player has previously been selected.

County breakdown
 Dublin = 7
 Kerry = 4
 Tyrone = 2
 Mayo = 1
 Donegal = 1

List of nominees

2020s

2020

 Player has previously been selected.

County breakdown
 Dublin = 9
 Cavan = 3
 Mayo = 2
 Tipperary = 1

2021

 Player has previously been selected.

County breakdown
 Tyrone = 8
 Mayo = 3
 Kerry = 3
 Dublin = 1

2022

 Player has previously been selected.

County breakdown
 Kerry = 7
 Galway = 5
 Derry = 2
 Dublin = 1

All Star Awards listed by team

Armagh

Cork

Derry

Donegal

Down

Dublin

Galway

Kerry

Kildare

Mayo

Meath

Monaghan

Offaly

Roscommon

Tyrone

See also
 List of All Stars Awards winners (hurling)
 Ladies' Gaelic football All Stars Awards
 Camogie All Stars Awards

References

External links
 All Stars at the Gaelic Athletic Association

Football
Gaelic football awards
All Stars Awards winners